Alosa volgensis, the Volga shad, is a clupeid fish, one of the species of shad endemic to the Caspian Sea region.

This is an anadromous species which ascends from the Caspian to the Volga river up to the Volgograd dam to spawn.  Also the Terek and Ural Rivers have belonged to the natural range.

References 
 
 Freyhof, J. & Kottelat, M. (2008) IUCN Red List.org: Alosa volgensis report—accessed 2015

volgensis
Fish of the Caspian Sea
Freshwater fish of Asia
Freshwater fish of Europe
Volga basin
Endangered fish
Endangered fauna of Asia
Endangered biota of Europe
Taxa named by Lev Berg
Fish described in 1913